Washington's 3rd legislative district is one of forty-nine districts in Washington state for representation in the state legislature. The district comprises most of inner Spokane. All but one of its 84 precincts are within the Spokane city limits (precinct 3000, with 8 voters, is just outside them).

The district's legislators are state senator Andy Billig and state representatives Marcus Riccelli (position 1) and Timm Ormsby (position 2), all Democrats.

List of Washington House of Representatives

Position 1

Position 2

See also
Washington Redistricting Commission
Washington State Legislature
Washington State Senate
Washington House of Representatives
Washington (state) legislative districts

References

External links
Washington State Redistricting Commission
Washington House of Representatives
Map of Legislative Districts

03
Spokane, Washington